In control theory and in particular when studying the properties of a linear time-invariant system in state space form, the Hautus lemma (after Malo L. J. Hautus), also commonly known as the Popov-Belevitch-Hautus test or PBH test, can prove to be a powerful tool. Today it can be found in most textbooks on control theory.

The main result
There exist multiple forms of the lemma.

Hautus Lemma for controllability
The Hautus lemma for controllability says that given a square matrix  and a  the following are equivalent:
 The pair  is controllable
 For all  it holds that 
 For all  that are eigenvalues of  it holds that

Hautus Lemma for stabilizability
The Hautus lemma for stabilizability says that given a square matrix  and a  the following are equivalent:
 The pair  is stabilizable

Hautus Lemma for observability
The Hautus lemma for observability says that given a square matrix  and a  the following are equivalent:
 The pair  is observable
 For all  it holds that 
 For all  that are eigenvalues of  it holds that

Hautus Lemma for detectability
The Hautus lemma for detectability says that given a square matrix  and a  the following are equivalent:
 The pair  is detectable

References

Control theory
Lemmas